Spiraea prunifolia, commonly called bridalwreath spirea, is a species of the genus Spiraea, sometimes also spelled Spirea. It flowers mid-spring, around May 5th, and is native to Japan, Korea, and China. It is sometimes cultivated as a garden plant elsewhere.

References

prunifolia